There are two professional associations responsible for regulation of accountancy in Portugal.

Ordem dos Técnicos Oficiais de Contas
Ordem dos Técnicos Oficiais de Contas (OTOC) runs an admittance examination every four months and everyone that passes it becomes a Técnico Oficial de Contas (TOC), the authorized tax and accountancy practitioner in Portugal.

OTOC, which is the largest Portuguese professional body, with more than 75,000 affiliates, offers a broad range of training programs to its members, and is an active member in the public discussion of accounting and finance issues.

Ordem dos Revisores Oficiais de Contas
Ordem dos Revisores Oficiais de Contas (OROC) confers the national qualification for auditors (ROC).

OROC is the national member of International Federation of Accountants (IFAC).

References

External links